Hasty pudding is a porridge of grains cooked in milk or water.

Hasty Pudding may also refer to:

 The Hasty-Pudding, a 1796 poem by Joel Barlow
 Hasty Pudding cipher, a variable-block-size block cipher designed by Richard Schroeppel
 Hasty Pudding Club, a Harvard University social club
 Hasty Pudding Theatricals, a theatrical student society at Harvard